Calthorpe is a surname. Notable people with the surname include:

 Anne Calthorpe (died c.1579), Countess of Sussex
 Sir Charles Calthorpe (c. 1540–1616), English-born judge in Elizabethan and early Jacobean Ireland
David Calthorpe (born 1973), former Australian rules footballer
Freddie Calthorpe (1892–1935), English cricketer
 James Calthorpe of Cockthorpe (c. 1558–1615),  Sheriff of Norfolk in 1614
 James Calthorpe (Yeoman of the Removing Wardrobe) (1699–1784), English politician and courtier
 Sir Henry Calthorpe (1586–1637), English lawyer
 Sir Henry Calthorpe (died 1788) of Elvetham in Hampshire, a Knight of the Bath and a Member of Parliament for Hindon
 Isabella Calthorpe, stage name of Isabella Anstruther-Gough-Calthorpe (born 1980), English actress and model
 Sir James Calthorpe of East Barsham (1604–1652), Sheriff of Norfolk in 1643
 Sir James Calthorpe (Roundhead) (died 1658), Sheriff of Suffolk, knighted by the Lord Protector Oliver Cromwell
 Mena Calthorpe (1905–1996), Australian writer
 Peter Calthorpe (born 1949)], architect and urban designer and planner
 Reynolds Calthorpe (1655–1719) of Elvetham in Hampshire, Member of Parliament for Hindon
 Reynolds Calthorpe, the younger (1689–1714),  Member of Parliament for Hindon 
 William Calthorpe (1410–1498), English aristocrat and Knight of the Bath
Gough-Calthorpe family  associated with the British title Baron Calthorpe:
Henry Gough-Calthorpe, 1st Baron Calthorpe (1749–1798), 2nd Baronet
Frederick Henry William Gough-Calthorpe, 5th Baron Calthorpe (1826–1893)
Augustus Gough-Calthorpe, 6th Baron Calthorpe (1829–1910)
Somerset Gough-Calthorpe, 7th Baron Calthorpe (1831–1912)
Somerset Gough-Calthorpe (1864–1937), English admiral of the fleet
Freddie Calthorpe (1892–1935), English cricketer